Success Dam is a dam across the Tule River in Tulare County, California in the United States.

The dam was initially authorized by the Flood Control Act of 1944 as part of an extensive system of dams and levees to provide flood protection in the Tulare Lake basin of the southern San Joaquin Valley. The U.S. Army Corps of Engineers (USACE) began construction of Success Dam in 1958 and finished in 1961, with the official dedication on May 18, 1962.

The USACE found in 1999 that the alluvial deposits that form the foundations of the dam were unstable and that the dam would be at a high risk of failure in the event of an earthquake. A proposed $500 million project would increase the thickness of the dam by  so that it could better withstand a quake in the region.

In August 2019, the 116th Congress of the United States enacted PL-116-41 which said (in part) that the Success Dam in Tulare County, California, shall hereafter be known and designated as the ‘‘Richard L. Schafer Dam’’.

See also
List of reservoirs and dams in California

References

Dams in the Tulare Basin
Buildings and structures in Tulare County, California
Dams in California
Earth-filled dams
United States Army Corps of Engineers dams
Dams completed in 1961